The Apple M-series coprocessors are motion coprocessors used by Apple Inc. in their mobile devices. First released in 2013, their function is to collect sensor data from integrated accelerometers, gyroscopes and compasses and offload the collecting and processing of sensor data from the main central processing unit (CPU).

The first coprocessor of the series is the M7 (codename Oscar), which was introduced in September 2013 as part of the iPhone 5S. Chipworks found that the M7 most likely is a NXP LPC1800 based microcontroller called LPC18A1. It uses an ARM Cortex-M3 core with a customised packaging and naming scheme indicating that it is for an Apple customized part. The updated version M8 was introduced in September 2014 with the iPhone 6 and also processes data from the barometer that is included in the iPhone 6 and iPad Air 2. iFixit have identified the M8 in the iPhone 6 to be an NXP device with a very similar name, the LPC18B1. 

The later coprocessors are embedded into the  A-series SoCs. September 2015 brought the M9 motion coprocessor embedded within the A9 chip found in the iPhone 6S, iPhone 6S Plus, first-generation iPhone SE and within the A9X chip found in the first-generation iPad Pro. The iPhone 7, iPhone 7 Plus, second-generation iPad Pro feature the M10 motion coprocessor, embedded within the A10 Fusion and the A10X Fusion chips.  Apple included the M11 in the iPhone 8, 8 Plus and iPhone X, embedded within the A11 Bionic SoC.

Starting with the A12 Bionic SoC, Apple has stopped distinguishing the motion coprocessor from the rest of the SoC, and has abandoned the corresponding M-series nomenclature. The M-series nomenclature was reintroduced in 2020 for ARM-based SoCs used in Mac computers and iPad tablets (starting from  the 5th generation iPad Pro).

Usage 
The Apple M-series coprocessors collect, process, and store sensor data even if the device is asleep, and applications can retrieve data when the device is powered up again. This reduces power draw of the device and saves battery life. In addition to servicing the accelerometer, gyroscope, compass, and in M8 and later coprocessors, barometer, the M9 coprocessor can recognize Siri voice commands from the built in microphones of the device.

The M-series motion coprocessors are accessible to applications through the Core Motion API introduced in iOS 7, so they do, for example, allow fitness apps that track physical activity and access data from the M processors without constantly engaging the main application processor. They enable applications to be aware of what type of movement the user is experiencing, such as driving, walking, running, or sleeping. Another application could be the ability to do indoor tracking and mapping. In iOS 10, the motion coprocessor is used to implement raise-to-wake functionality, reducing idle energy usage.

Products

Gallery

See also 
 Apple A series
 Apple A7
 Apple A8
 Apple A8X
 Apple A9
 Apple A9X
 Apple A10 Fusion
 Apple A10X Fusion
 Apple A11 Bionic

References 

Motion coprocessors
Coprocessors
Products introduced in 2013